The Trans-Arabian Pipeline (Tapline), was an oil pipeline from Qaisumah in Saudi Arabia to Sidon in Lebanon, active between 1950–1976. In its heyday, it was an important factor in the global trade of petroleum, as well as in American–Middle Eastern political relations, while locally helping with the economic development of Lebanon.

History

Construction of the Trans-Arabian Pipeline began in 1947 and was mainly managed by the American company Bechtel. Consolidated Steel of Los Angeles was contracted to provide 980 miles of pipe in March 1947 (date of press notice) and the National Tube Company of Pittsburgh (a U.S. Steel subsidiary) for another 70 miles. Originally the Tapline was intended to terminate in Haifa, which was then in the British Mandate of Palestine, but due to the establishment of the state of Israel, an alternative route through Syria (Golan Heights) and Lebanon was selected with an export terminal in Sidon. 

The Syrian government initially opposed the plan. Four days after a military coup that overthrew democratic rule the deal was ratified. The coup's leader Husni al-Za'im was overthrown and murdered 136 days later, but the project was unstoppable.

Since the 1967 Six-Day War, the section of the pipeline which runs through the Golan Heights came under Israeli control, though the Israelis permitted the pipeline's operation to continue. After years of constant arguing between Saudi Arabia and Syria and Lebanon over transit fees, the emergence of oil supertankers, and pipeline breakdowns, the section of the line beyond Jordan ceased operation in 1976. The remainder of the line between Saudi Arabia and Jordan continued to transport modest amounts of petroleum until 1990 when the Saudis cut off the pipeline in response to Jordan's support of Iraq during the first Gulf War. Today, the entire line is unfit for oil transport.

Technical features
When constructed, it was the world's largest oil pipeline system. The pipeline was supplied from the oil fields near Abqaiq.

The Tapline corridor has remained a potential export route for Persian Gulf oil exports to Europe and the United States. At least one analysis has indicated that the transportation cost of exporting oil via the Tapline through Haifa to Europe would cost as much as 40 percent less than shipping by tanker through the Suez Canal. In early 2005, rehabilitation of the Tapline at an estimated cost of US$100 to US$300 million was one of the strategic options being considered by the Jordanian government to meet oil needs.

Pipeline company
The pipeline was built and operated by the Trans-Arabian Pipeline Company. It was founded as a joint venture between Standard Oil of New Jersey (now ExxonMobil), Standard Oil of California (Chevron), the Texas Company (better known as Texaco, now a part of Chevron), and Socony-Vacuum Oil Company (now part of ExxonMobil), however, it eventually became a fully owned subsidiary of Aramco. The company continued operating with no oil being transported until the end of 2002, when Aramco fully closed the Tapline subsidiary.

Tapline Road
For the Israeli Road see: Petroleum Road

Tapline Road is the major east-west two lane highway running the length of Saudi Arabia from Turaif, on Saudi Arabia's border with Jordan, in the west, to Qaisumah, on the Persian Gulf, in the east. It was so named because it parallels the Trans-Arabian Pipeline. The Tapline Road was, on average, only 50 kilometers from Saudi Arabia's northern border for a distance of 514 miles or 827.2 kilometers. Initially only a dirt and gravel road used by ARAMCO and the Saudi Government it was widened and paved by 1965 due to use by civilian and commercial traffic. It was incorporated into the Saudi Highway system in 1965 when it was extended into Dammam. Since Tapline Road is a semi-private road mostly maintained by Aramco, and has been assigned the number 6335 until it meets Highway 85 (King Fahd Road) where-after it is maintained by the Saudi Arabian Ministry of Transport, it remains Highway 85 until near the Jordanian border where it meets Highway 65, in Qurayyat and crosses the Jordanian Border at Umari and becomes Jordanian Highway 30. Tapline Road/Highway 85 is deemed one of the most dangerous roads in the world due to its straightness.

See also

East–West Crude Oil Pipeline
Arab Gas Pipeline
Kirkuk–Haifa oil pipeline, active 1935–1948
Petroleum Road
March 1949 Syrian coup d'état

References

External links

 Tapline overview and history
 Tapline's magazine, the "Pipeline Periscope" from 1953-1974.
 “Oil Across Arabia”, a 1950 Bechtel company documentary.

Oil pipelines in Lebanon
Oil pipelines in Jordan
Oil pipelines in Syria
Oil pipelines in Saudi Arabia
Roads in Saudi Arabia
Saudi Aramco
Jordan–Saudi Arabia relations
Jordan–Syria relations
Saudi Arabia–Syria relations